A boy genius is a male child prodigy.

Boy Genius may refer to:
 Jimmy Neutron: Boy Genius, a 2001 American computer-animated film
 boygenius, an American music group 
 Boy Genius, a novel by Yongsoo Park
 "Boy Genius", a song by Kwamé from the 1989 album Kwamé the Boy Genius: Featuring a New Beginning
 "Boy Genius", song by Michael Beltrami from The Omen (2006 film) soundtrack
 "Boy Genius", song by Reverend Zen from the 2006 album Angels, Blues & the Crying Moon
 Boy Genius, a performing name of Brandon Boyer (born 1977)

See also
 
 Genius (disambiguation)
 Boy Genius Report, a website
 The Adventures of Barry Ween, Boy Genius, a comic book by Judd Wynick
 The Boy Genius and the Mogul: The Untold Story of Television, a book by Daniel Stashower
 Girl Genius, a comic book